Scottish Widows is a life insurance and pensions company located in Edinburgh, Scotland, and is a subsidiary of Lloyds Banking Group. Its product range includes life assurance and pensions. The company has been providing financial services to the UK market since 1815. The company sells products through independent financial advisers, direct to customers and through Lloyds Banking Group bank branches. The investment and asset management arm (Scottish Widows Investment Partnership) was sold in 2013 to Aberdeen Asset Management.

History

In March 1812, a number of prominent Scotsmen gathered in the Royal Exchange Coffee Rooms in Edinburgh. They were there to discuss setting up 'a general fund for securing provisions to widows, sisters and other female relatives' of fundholders so that they would not be plunged into poverty on the death of the fundholder during and after the Napoleonic Wars. Scottish Widows' Fund and Life Assurance Society opened in 1815 as Scotland's first mutual life office. 

Regulations made in 1811 showed its focus on providing annuities for dependants, but this quickly became only a small part of the company's business. They also set eligibility requirements; for example, those over fifty years old or those with a wife more than twenty years younger than himself could not apply.

Scottish Widows granted just 10 policies to female customers in the first four years, as applications from women were rare at the time. One example is Catherine Drummond in 1818, who as an unmarried woman requested annuity of £50 once turning sixty years old.

Its most noteworthy leader was Very Rev James Grant, who served as its director for 50 years (1840–1890).

In 1999, Lloyds TSB agreed to buy the society for £7 billion. The society demutualised on 3 March 2000 as part of the acquisition. At the time of its takeover, Scottish Widows set up an "additional account" to hold £1.7 billion of the proceeds from the sale. This fund was to be used to enhance terminal bonuses across the company, but was eventually used to compensate guaranteed annuity rate options (GARs) holders.

In April 2009, Lloyds Banking Group announced that the sales team of Clerical Medical would be merged into that of Scottish Widows, and the Clerical Medical brand would eventually be phased out.

In November 2013, Lloyds Banking Group sold its asset management division, Scottish Widows Investment Partnership (SWIP) to Aberdeen Asset Management in a £660m deal.

In 2015, Scottish Widows sold Clerical Medical's Isle of Man operations to international life assurance company RL360°.

Advertising

The Scottish Widow first appeared in a television advert directed by David Bailey in 1986. Since then, Scottish Widows has made 10 adverts featuring the Scottish Widow.

Four models have portrayed the Scottish Widow, a hooded character featured in the company's advertising. The original Widow, chosen to portray the company's brand values in the 'Looking Good' commercial in 1986, was Deborah Moore, daughter of actor Roger Moore. In 1994, Amanda Lamb took over the role. Hayley Hunt became the third Scottish Widow in 2005. In 2014, the company announced that the fourth Scottish Widow would be Amber Martinez.

Emblems 
In 1818, Scottish Widows adopted an emblem created by William Home Lizars, which features the Roman goddess Ceres (Plenty) holding a cornucopia and accompanied by cherubs. A tombstone is seen on her left and a widow kneels on her right with her daughters. This imagery represented the company's goal to support female dependants facing financial loss. The emblem was not only used as the company arms, but also in its policy documents.

In 1832, Sir Johns Steell was inspired by the 1818 emblem to sculpture figures of a widow, her children, and Ceres into the ornamentation of the company's building in 5 St Andrew Square. 

The emblem on the cover of the 1914 Scottish Widows annual report was designed by Walter Crane in 1888. It featured Perseus and Pegasus, a symbol of immortality.

Sponsorships 
Scottish Widows was the Official Pensions and Investment Provider of the London 2012 Olympic and Paralympic Games. The company employs athletes Roger Black MBE and Sarah Storey OBE as their Olympic Ambassadors.

In popular culture
Scottish Widows is briefly mentioned in Yuval Harari's 2011 book Sapiens: A Brief History of Humankind. Harari confuses the present day company with an earlier fund set up half a century earlier by two ministers of the Church of Scotland on behalf of the widows of church ministers. Harari rightly credits the original fund as the first of its kind and describes the sequence of events accurately. The beneficiaries were, in that sense, Scottish widows. But there is no connection between the earlier fund, officially known as the Scottish Ministers' Widows Fund, and the present day Company. The original fund finally closed in 1993, its work done.

References

External links

Official website

Financial services companies established in 1815
Companies based in Edinburgh
British companies established in 1815
Insurance companies of Scotland
Former mutual insurance companies
Lloyds Banking Group
Life insurance companies of the United Kingdom
Scottish brands
1815 establishments in Scotland
Widowhood in the United Kingdom
2000 mergers and acquisitions